Sayyid Muhammad ibn Shuja' al-Din ibn Ibrahim ibn Qasim Shah al-Husayni al-Makki, 1145–1246, also known as Sayyid Mahmood Shah al-Makki and well known by the nickname of "Sher Sawār" or "Lion Rider", was the ancestor of the Bukkuri or Bhaakri Sayyids who founded Bukkur and was the first Sayyid to ever migrate from the Middle East to the Sindh region in today's Pakistan. He was a saint of the people of Sindh, a warrior who fought battles against Abbasids, a ruler over Yemen and an explorer who travelled frequently. He was a Sayyid and a descendant of Ali and Fatimah through Ali al-Hadi.

Birth and upbringing

The father of the Sayyid was Abu Ahmad Muhammad Shuja. Sayyid Muhammad Shuja once left his native Mashhad with the intention of pilgrimage to the holy cities of Mecca and Medina. On the way Sayyid Muhammad Shuja passed through Baghdad where he met Abu Hafs Umar al-Suhrawardi, after spending some time in his presence, Suhrawardi gave his daughter in marriage to Sayyid Muhammad Shuja. Proceeding to Mecca along with his wife, he found that his wife was pregnant and was in immense pain. Unable to bear the pangs of childbirth, the lady gave birth to Sayyid Muhammad in the courtyard of the Kaaba who was born in 1145 and the Islamic year of 540 AH. He later became well known as Muhammad the Meccan. Some scholars however disputed this marriage of Sayyid Muhammad Shuja to a daughter of al-Suhrawardi and have mentioned that it was Sayyid Muhammad al-Makki himself who married the daughter of al-Suhrawardi.
Sayyid Muhammad al-Makki was taught the sciences of Islam by his father and brother, Sayyid Ahmad, who both ensured the young Sayyid was well trained to propagate and spread Islam in his wanderings. To fully understand the childhood of the Sayyid, it must be taken into consideration that he grew up in the era of the Crusades while he was brought up in the heart of Islam, Mecca. It shaped his psychology which eventually led to his interest in military training and his later military endeavors.

In Yemen

In 1174 AD, Turan-Shah, the brother of Saladin conquered Zabid and Aden in South Yemen and this eventually led to all of Southern Yemen being under Ayyubid control. Abbasids, who were allies of Ayyubids also gained influence in Yemen. Sayyid Muhammad al-Makki, who was now twenty-nine years old, entered Yemen from the North from his native Mecca. With the force of the sword, he killed many Abbasids, routing them away from Yemen. His hostility towards the Abbasid caliphate, is an Alid, as a result of the historical ongoing feud between Alids and Abbasids who on numerous occasions killed Alids wherever they were able, the Battle of Fakhkh and the murder of numerous ancestors are notable reasons. He ruled his province in Yemen for approximately ten years. Sayyid Muhammad decided to leave Yemen for Sindh and left a representative, claiming he saw his ancestor, the Islamic prophet Muhammad in his dream instructing him to leave for India as it awaited him.

The Sayyid then headed North and stopped at Medina, where he visited the grave of his ancestor Muhammad and other ancestors in al-Baqi'. He then went to Mecca and sought refuge with the Kaaba. Eventually, it is said he had another dream of Muhammad instructing him to proceed towards India.

In Mashhad

Muhammad al-Makki on his way to Sindh stopped at many places to camp. He first stopped at Baghdad, then Mashhad, then Herat and finally Sindh. When he stopped at Mashhad he visited the shrine of his forefather Ali al-Ridha at Mashhad. The Sayyid was very much attached to Mashhad for it was a city some of his ancestors lived in. He visited the library of his grandfather, Sayyid Ibrahim Jawwādi, and remained in Mashhad. By the time he left the land of Iran, he had an army of 30,000 and led this army towards the land of Bukkur, fighting his way through native hostile armies of Khurasan and India who challenged him.

In Sindh

It is mentioned in many sources that Sayyid Muhammad al-Makki arrived in Bukkur at dawn.

Delighted at the peaceful setting and beautiful view of the sun rising, he famously and joyfully exclaimed: "God has ordained my morning in this blessed place!" 
(Arabic: ! جعل الله بكرتي في البقعة المباركة). Sayyid Muhammad also named this place 'Bukkur' from its former name 'Fareshta'. Upon being asked where he wanted to live by the welcoming natives he told them he wanted to live where the cowbells could be heard and the rising sun would be visible. Sayyid Muhammad al-Makki obtained a grant of land in Rohri with the condition expressed in the deed that he should cultivate the land in lieu of the military duties obligatory on all granted landowners. Due to the warlike nature of this tribe, they were entrusted by the authorities to prevent marauders and bandits from thieving and looting.  Sayyid Muhammad al-Makki became a well-known saint whose preaching brought many people towards Islam. He established a centre of spiritual learning in Sindh and remained the religious figure of Sindh until the early 13th century.

Death

Muhammad al-Makki died at the age of 101 in 1246 AD and 644 AH. He was buried in the fort of Arak between Sukkur and Bukkur
His shrine is located near Deputy Commissioner Office Sukkur. Location of Shrine Of Muhammad Al Makki In Sukkur

Grandfather

Sayyid Ibrahim al-Jawwadi was born in Mashhad in 1040 and died in 1132 during the era of the Seljuq dynasty and was the grandfather of Sayyid Muhammad al-Makki. Although Sayyid Muhammad al-Makki did not ever meet his grandfather, it is proven from sources that he inherited books and other items which belonged to Sayyid Ibrahim and it greatly influenced his upbringing in the realm of spirituality. He received books and journals relating to events in the life of Sayyid Ibrahim.

It is mentioned in sources related to Bukkuri Sayyids that Sayyid Ibrahim had mastered fourteen Islamic sciences and was a very generous, hence he was nicknamed 'Jawwadi' or 'The Generous One'. It is mentioned that in the time of Toghril Beg, the Assassins group which was founded by Hassan-i Sabbah was causing havoc in the region and spreading bloodshed and plundering. Upset at this, Toghril came to Sayyid Ibrahim and asked him to pray. Sayyid Ibrahim went to the tomb of his ancestor Imam Ali al-Ridha and made a prayer while Toghril said ; 'Amen'. Shortly after it is mentioned that the Assassins had stopped murdering and plundering for a time.

Sayyid Ibrahim was childless for a long time and was very upset at this. It is mentioned that he would frequently visit the shrine of Imam Ali al-Ridha and pray to God. One day, he lost patience and began to cry bitterly and became unconscious. Leaving the shrine happy, he told people that he saw Ali al-Ridha in his dream who told him; "Do not cry Ibrahim, Allah (God) will give you a child". Shortly after this event, the father of Sayyid Muhammad al-Makki, Sayyid Muhammad Shuja, was born.

Father

Sayyid Muhammad Shuja was an expert in the field of Hadith and Fiqh. He was also an expert in the arts of swordsmanship, archery, wrestling and on horseback. He was also very brave in battle which gave him the title of 'Shuja' or 'The Brave'. In 1132, a ruler in Iran, Sayfullah Khan and Turkey went to war. Sayyid Muhammad Shuja, who was then ruling Khorasan, was appointed in command of an army of 10,000 and fought the Turkish army in a mountainous region. Sayyid Muhammad Shuja then returned to Iran victorious after a bloody and lengthy battle. The king of Iran gave his daughter Safiyya Khatūn in marriage as a gift to Sayyid Muhammad Shuja. This was the first marriage of the Sayyid before the daughter of Suhrawardi. It has also been mention in ancient sources that the Sayyid also travelled to places including Karachi, Thatta and Lahore.

Ancestors

 Ali ibn Abu Talib
 Husayn ibn Ali
 Ali ibn Husayn
 Muhammad al-Baqir
 Jafar al-Sadiq
 Musa al-Kadhim
 Ali al-Ridha
 Muhammad al-Taqi
 Ali al-Hadi 
 Ja'far al Zaki
 Ismail Harifa
 Aqeel
 Harun
 Hamza
 Ja'far
 Zaid
 Qasim
 Ibrahim al Jawadi
 Muhammad Shuja
 Muhammad al Makki Makhdoom

Makhdoom Muhammad Badruddin Bhaakri 

Not to be confused with his nephew from Sayyid Sadruddin who shares the same name, Sayyid Muhammad Badruddin was born between 1205 and 1210 AD in Bukkur. He was a pious Sayyid who was often known by his strength in his religion, keen interest in spirituality, and remembrance of God. He was instructed in a dream by the Islamic Prophet Muhammad to marry his daughters, Sayyidah Fatima Sa'eedah Habeebah and Sayyidah Tahireh to Jalaluddin Surkh-Posh Bukhari. However, since Jalaluddin was known to be someone who dressed like a poor person due to his spirituality and humility, the brothers of Muhammad Badruddin, Sayyid Mah, Sayyid Shams, and Sayyid Sadruddin objected to this marriage. When the objection was not taken into consideration by Sayyid Muhammad Badruddin, the brothers ordered his exile and the exile of Sayyid Jalaluddin from Bukkur.Sayyid Badruddin and his son in law, Sayyid Jalaluddin migrated to Uch where both are buried.

Sayyid Badruddin's descendants are plenty in number. His descendants come from many sons including Sayyid Muhammad Mahdi who was born from the daughter of Alauddin Khalji and Sayyid Sa'adullah. Sayyid Muhammad Mahdi's descendants migrated all around Pakistan including Attock, Rohtas Fort, Kallar Syedan, Mansehra, Haripur District, Taxila, Sialkot, SAMANA, Jalandhar, Patiala,  Nabha, Kapoor Thala, Malir Kotla, Jagraon migrated from Uch and returned to areas included in Pakistan nowadays after partition (Ali Pur,RYK, TT Singh, Sangla Hill, Shah Kot, Pir Mahal, Sahiwal, Lahore, Faisalabad, Multan, etc) and many other places. From this line is Waris Shah, the author of Heer Ranjha, the famous romantic story.

Sayyid Sadruddin al-Khatib 

The saint Sayyid Sadruddin, the son of Sayyid Muhammad Shah al-Makki was born in 1204 AD in Bukkur. His influence spread all around the Indian Sub-Continent and was well known for his spirituality. He spent most of his life travelling and seeking knowledge from other parts of the world. He died in 1270 AD and is buried on Bukkur Island.

Sayyid Sadruddin's son Ali Badruddin had many sons including Sayyid Murtadha also known as Shaban ul Millat, whose descendants are found mostly in Allahabad in India. From the descendants of Sayyid Ali Badruddin comes the author of Manba Al-Ansab, Sayyid Muin Al-Haqq and many other famous historical personalities. Other sons of Sayyid Ali Badruddin are Sayyid Daulat Ahmad, Sayyid Nazamuddin, Sayyid Ruknuddin and Sayyid Muhyuddin.

Sayyid Maah and Sayyid Shams 

Both were the sons of Sayyid Muhammad al-Makki and were born in Yemen. They migrated with their father to India. However, they have no known progeny.

References

1145 births
1246 deaths